Fritz Albicker (II) (1893 - 15 October 1959) was a Swiss footballer who played for FC Basel. 

Albicker was born in 1893.

Between the years 1910 and 1917 Albicker played a total of 24 games, scoring one goal, for Basel. Eight of these games were in the Swiss Serie A and 16 were friendly games. He played mainly as midfielder.

Sources and References
 Rotblau: Jahrbuch Saison 2017/2018. Publisher: FC Basel Marketing AG. 

FC Basel players
Swiss men's footballers
Association football midfielders
1893 births
1959 deaths